Sriwittayapaknam School is a normal school in Paknam, Samut Prakan, Thailand. It was founded as a kindergarten in 1955 by Mrs Sawaiwong Sooksri, and has grown to serve some 1,770 students aged 3 to 15 for kindergarten to junior high school levels.

Students from the school created a website devoted to the film, The Beach, starring Leonardo DiCaprio. The website, "Footsteps on the Beach", received praise including BBC Movies "website of the week" and the Bangkok Post's "Internet Site of the Week". Well-known travel blogger and British expat Richard Barrow has been a teacher at this school since 1994.

References

External links
 School website
 Students' website
 Footsteps on the Beach
 Teaching in a Thai School

Schools in Thailand
Education in Samutprakan province
Educational institutions established in 1955
Buildings and structures in Samut Prakan province
1955 establishments in Thailand